Ollie Norris (born 11 December 1999) is a New Zealand rugby union player who plays for the  in Super Rugby. His playing position is prop. He has signed for the Chiefs.

Reference list

External links
itsrugby.co.uk profile

1999 births
New Zealand rugby union players
Living people
Rugby union props
Waikato rugby union players
Chiefs (rugby union) players
Māori All Blacks players
Rugby union players from Sydney